The Styr is a right tributary of the Pripyat, with a length of 494 km. Its basin area is 13,100 km2 located in historical region of Volhynia.

The Styr begins near Brody, in the Ukrainian Oblast of Lviv, then flows into Rivne Oblast, Volyn Oblast, then into Brest Region of Belarus where it finally flows into the Pripyat.

During the Khmelnytskyi Uprising, in 1651 at Styr river took place important battle of Berestechko between armies of the Polish-Lithuanian Commonwealth and the Cossacks of Bohdan Khmelnytsky.

During 1915–1916, the Styr river was the front line between the Austro-Hungarian and Imperial Russian armies.

The river was also a barrier to the German invasion on June 22, 1941, during Operation Barbarossa on the South-Western Front.

Notable settlements located on the river are Lutsk, Staryi Chortoryisk and Varash.

Tributaries
 Left: Radostavka, Sudylivka, Chornohuzka, Serna, Liutytsia, Okinka, Richytsia, Zhyduvka, Omelianyk
 Right: Ikva, Slonivka, Pliashivka, Boldurka, Liubka, Rudka, Kormyn, Riv, Konopelka, Sapalayivka

Images

References

International rivers of Europe
Rivers of Belarus
Rivers of Brest Region
Rivers of Lviv Oblast
Rivers of Rivne Oblast
Rivers of Volyn Oblast